The Soroti Power Station is a  solar power plant in Uganda. It was the largest grid-connected, "privately-funded solar power plant in Sub-Saharan Africa, outside of South Africa" at its commissioning and until the Pilot Solar Power Plant (20MW) of The Xsabo Group in Kabulasoke (Kabulasoke Solar Power Station) in Central Uganda was completed and commissioned in January 2019.

Location

The geographical coordinates of Soroti Solar Power Station are
1°41'06.0"N, 33°39'29.0"E (Latitude:1.685000; Longitude:33.658056).

Overview
The power station has a 10 megawatt capacity. Its output is sold directly to the Uganda Electricity Transmission Company Limited for integration into the national grid. The power is evacuated via a substation near the station. It has been estimated that the energy generated could power approximately 40,000 homes located near the station, thereby minimizing transmission losses. The power station, which consists of 32,680 photovoltaic panels, is Uganda's first grid-connected solar plant.

Developers
The power station was developed by a consortium of Access Power Limited (through its subsidiary Access Uganda Solar), a company based in the United Arab Emirates, and TSK Electrónica y Electricidad, a company based in Spain. They won the competitive bidding and were awarded the development contract at the same time as the developers of the Tororo Solar Power Station.

As of February 2022, the power station has been sold to and is now owned by Total Eren, the renewable energy subsidiary of the French energy  conglomerate, TotalEnergies.

Construction costs, funding, and commissioning
The construction costs were US$19 million. The project received partial funding from the European Union Infrastructure Trust Fund through KfW. On 12 December 2016, the solar plant was switched on.

See also

List of power stations in Uganda
TotalEnergies
Umeme

References

External links
 10MW solar power project launched in Soroti
 Uganda Secures Funding for Key Solar PV Projects
 Uganda To Increase Power Generation
 20MW of solar energy to be added to national grid

Solar power stations in Uganda
Soroti District
Eastern Region, Uganda
2016 establishments in Uganda
Energy infrastructure completed in 2016